"Nemo" is the eighth single by Finnish symphonic metal band Nightwish and the first from the album Once. A big-budget video was made for the song; the director was Antti Jokinen, who had previously worked with Shania Twain, Celine Dion and Eminem. The video was number one on MTV Brasil Video Chart. The song was nominated for the Kerrang! Award for Best Single. Although Nightwish already enjoyed a solid fan base in Europe and South America by the time of the single's release, it is considered their breakthrough song since it helped them reach a wider audience.

The song can be heard in the ending credits of the 2005 film The Cave.

Composition 
Keyboardist and songwriter Tuomas Holopainen says the song was "one of the most difficult songs" the band's ever done. It took them months to work on the arrangement. The first version was faster and two minutes longer, but recording engineer Tero Kinnunen suggested they cut off a certain section and slowed it down by about 10 bpm.

Lyrics 
Holopainen has stated that the title is Latin for "nobody" or "no name" and the song is based on his occasional feelings of being lost, longing for the past and feeling nameless. This contradicts speculations that the song simply borrows on a Nemo character of an earlier work, such as J. Verne's Captain Nemo, Homer's Ulysses alias Nemo, C. Dickens’ Captain Hawdon alias Nemo, W. McCay's Little Nemo, or the Disney Studio's film Finding Nemo. Asked about that, Holopainen responded:

In a 2016 interview, he said he "was just a much darker person then than I am now" and that he "would never do a song like that again".

Music video 
The song received a video that cost around  €80,000, which is much more than most heavy metal videos cost at that time. It was directed by Finnish director Antti Jokinen and shows the band performing among snowy mountains. Then vocalist Tarja Turunen is wearing a red coat, which she admits to be different from other symphonic metal female vocalists, who usually dress in black. A second version of the video included footage from The Cave.

The video was heavily played on TVs around the world, but according to Turunen, some channels were reluctant at first due to the video having been shot in the snow. Also, she said the video helped the band gain more attention from gothic fans, even though she doesn't believe they have ever considered themselves to be a gothic band.

Live performances 
Nemo is the most played song by Nightwish, with well over 500 times as of March 2018. After Turunen left Nightwish, "Nemo" became one of the songs from the band that she would perform live in her solo shows.

Track listings

Personnel
Personnel are adapted from the Nightwish website.

Chart performance 
"Nemo" topped the charts in Finland and Hungary; in the former country, it was the highest-selling single of 2004 from a domestic artist. In the United Kingdom, it charted at number 87, giving Nightwish their first chart entry, and peaked at number five on the UK Rock Chart. Elsewhere in Europe, the single became a top-10 hit in Germany and Norway and a top-20 hit in Austria, Sweden, and Switzerland. "Nemo" was certified platinum in Finland, selling 13,109 copies.

Weekly charts

Year-end charts

Sales and certifications 

|}

References

External links 
 Nightwish's Official Website

Nightwish songs
2004 singles
Rock ballads
Heavy metal ballads
Number-one singles in Finland
Songs written by Tuomas Holopainen
2004 songs
Nuclear Blast Records singles